Shaun Pizzonia (born March 9, 1968), or Sting International, is an American musician, DJ, sound engineer, song writer, and two-time Grammy Award winning producer best known for his work with Jamaican musician Shaggy and English musician Sting.

Pizzonia was well known for his knowledge across numerous genres, and is one of the most in-demand radio and club DJ's. He has been influential in broadening dancehall reggae's audience. The name "Sting International", is based on an acronym of four DJ names: Shaun, Tony, Ian and Gary. "I threw an N in there and got STING, and I added International to it because it sounded f**king grand and everybody loved it."

In 1996, Pizzonia founded Big Yard Records with Robert Livingston and Shaggy. After departing Big Yard in 2011, Pizzonia formed the record label Ranch Entertainment Inc (REI) with Shaggy, Paul Rossi, and Yoichi Imai, and Shaun is the label's chief producer.

Selected works
 "Oh Carolina" single (1993) – producer 
 "Big Up" single (1993) – producer, co-writer
 Boombastic album (1995) – producer, arranger, performer, co-writer
 "It Wasn't Me" single (2000) – producer, co-writer
 "Angel" single (2000) – producer
 Clothes Drop album (2005) – co-writer
 Intoxication album (2007) – producer, co-writer
 "Everything You Need" track (2011) – performer
 Summer in Kingston album (2011) – producer, co-writer
 Rise album (2012) – co-writer
 44/876 album (2018) – producer, co-writer

Awards and nominations
Grammy Awards

References

Musicians from New York City
Grammy Award winners
Living people
1968 births